Ikram Akhtar is an Indian screenwriter, producer and director working in Bollywood. He has started acting institute named Ikram Akhtar Actor Factors.

Controversy
Moradabad court has issued warrant against him in fraud of 1. 5crore case.

Filmography

Director

Writer

References 

https://www.bollywoodhungama.com/celebrity/ikram-akhtar/filmography/

External links
 

Indian male screenwriters
Living people
21st-century Indian film directors
Hindi-language film directors
Hindi film producers
Year of birth missing (living people)